Odie is a masculine given name and nickname which may refer to:

 Odie Armstrong (born 1981), American football player
 Odie Cleghorn (1891–1956), Canadian ice hockey player, coach, linesman and referee
 Odie Harris (born 1966), American former National Football League player
 Odie Payne (1926–1989), American Chicago blues drummer
 Odie Spears (1924-1985), American National Basketball Association player

Masculine given names
Lists of people by nickname